Doğuş Media Group (Doğuş Yayın Grubu) is a Turkish media conglomerate, part of the Doğuş Group conglomerate. Its properties include the news channel NTV (since 1999) and the entertainment channel Star TV (since 2011).

From 2009 to 2013 it published history magazine NTV Tarih.

On 27 January, Doğuş Media Group submitted an application to the European Broadcasting Union for its flagship channel Star TV.

Properties

Television 

 1993-1994: Kanal D (sold to Doğan Media Group)
 1999-: NTV (acquired from Nergis Group)
 1999-2000: Cine5 (sold to Sabah Group)
 2000-2015: CNBC-e (sold to Discovery Group)
 2004-2017: Euro D (sold to Demirören Group)
 2004-2011: NBA TV Turkey (sold to Doğan Media Group)
 2007-2016: e2 (sold to Çukurova Group)
 2008-: Kral TV (acquired from TMSF)
 2008-2018: NTV Spor (sold to Discovery Group)
 2008-2011: Discovery Channel Turkey (sold to Doğan Media Group)
 2011: Boomerang TV (sold to Dogan Media Group)
 2011-: Euro Star (acquired from Doğan Media Group)
 2011-2013: 24 TV (sold to Sancak Group)
 2011-: Exxen
 2011-: Star TV (acquired from Doğan Media Group)
 2012-: TV8 (acquired from Acun Medya)

Radio 

 2001-: Radyo 1
 2002-: TRT FM
 2003-2011: Radyo 3
 2006-2008: Best FM Turkey (sold to Ciner Media Group)
 2007-: TRT Nağme
 2008-: Joy FM Turkey (acquired from TMSF)
 2008-2013: Virgin Radio (sold to Anadolu Group)
 2008-2009: TRT Türkü (sold to Turkuvaz Media Group)
 2009-: Metro FM
 2009-: Number One (acquired from Ali Naci Karacan)
 2010-2011: Radyo5 (acquired from TMSF)
 2011-: Power FM (acquired from Cem Hakko)

References 

 http://www.dogusyayingrubu.com/assets/docs/DYG_KIT_2015_ENG_V4.pdf

External links 
 Doğuş Media Group

Mass media companies of Turkey
Doğuş Group
Sarıyer